Two ships of the United States Navy have been named Antrim:

 
 

United States Navy ship names